Mónica Ríos Marrero (born 10 December 1996) is an American-raised Puerto Rican footballer who plays as a midfielder for the Puerto Rico women's national team.

Early life
Ríos was raised in Lexington, Kentucky.

References

1996 births
Living people
Women's association football midfielders
Puerto Rican women's footballers
Puerto Rico women's international footballers
American women's soccer players
Soccer players from Kentucky
Sportspeople from Lexington, Kentucky
American sportspeople of Puerto Rican descent
Eastern Kentucky Colonels women's soccer players